Dolichobela is a monotypic moth genus of the family Crambidae described by Alfred Jefferis Turner in 1932. It contains only one species, Dolichobela celidograpta, described in the same publication, which is found in Australia, where it has been recorded from Queensland.

The larvae have been recorded feeding on the fruit of Capparis mitchellii.

References

Midilinae
Monotypic moth genera
Crambidae genera
Taxa named by Alfred Jefferis Turner